The 7th Prices Information Cup began on 28 March 2011 and ended 28 September 2011.

Qualified players
Block A
Lee Younggu 2–0
Choi Cheol-han 2–1

Block B
Lee Sedol 2–0
Kim Seongjae 2–1

Block C
Yun Junsang 2–0
Mok Jin-seok 2–1

Block D
Hong Sungji 2–0
An Choyoung 2–1

Tournament

References

2011 in go
Go competitions in South Korea